Pak Wai is a village in the Hebe Haven area of Sai Kung District, Hong Kong. It is located along Hiram's Highway, next to the Marina Cove housing development.

Administration
Pak Wai is a recognized village under the New Territories Small House Policy.

History
Pak Wai is a mixed clan village, probably established in the late 17th century. It appears on the "Map of the San-On District", published in 1866 by Simeone Volonteri.

See also
 Nam Wai

References

External links

 Delineation of area of existing village Pak Wai (Sai Kung) for election of resident representative (2019 to 2022)

Villages in Sai Kung District, Hong Kong